Elijah "E.J." Warner is an American football quarterback who currently plays for the Temple Owls.

Early life and high school
Warner grew up in Phoenix, Arizona and initially attended Desert Mountain High School. He transferred to Brophy College Preparatory school after his freshman year. As a senior, Warner passed for 2,742 yards and 26 touchdowns. Warner committed to play college football at Temple over offers from Colorado State, Hawaii, Marshall, and UConn.

College career
Warner began his freshman season at Temple as a backup. He made his collegiate debut on September 10, 2022, in relief of starter D'Wan Mathis against Lafayette and completed 14-of-19 pass attempts for 173 yards and two touchdowns in a 30-14 victory. Warner was named Temple's starting quarterback for the following week's game against Rutgers and passed for 215 yards with one touchdown and one interception in a 16-14 loss. He set school single-game records with 42 pass completions and 486 yards and had three touchdown passes on 59 attempts in a 43-36 loss to Houston on November 12, 2022. Warner broke both records in the final game of the season, completing 45-of-63 passes for 527 yards and five touchdowns as the Owls lost to East Carolina 49-46. He was named the American Athletic Conference (AAC) Rookie of the Year after finishing the season with 3,028 passing yards, the most by a freshman and the second most in a season in Temple history, and 18 touchdown passes.

Statistics

Personal life
Warner is the son of Pro Football Hall of Fame quarterback Kurt Warner. His older brother, Kade Warner, plays wide receiver at Kansas State after beginning his college career at Nebraska.

References

External links
Temple Owls profile

Living people
Players of American football from Phoenix, Arizona
American football quarterbacks
Temple Owls football players
Year of birth missing (living people)